Avatar 4 is an upcoming American epic science fiction film co-written, co-edited, co-produced and directed by James Cameron. It will be the sequel to the upcoming 2024 Avatar 3, and the fourth installment in the Avatar franchise. It will star Sam Worthington and Zoe Saldaña, among others from the original cast, reprising their roles. The screenplay is written by James Cameron and Josh Friedman. The film is scheduled to be released on December 18, 2026, by 20th Century Studios and is planned to be followed by a sequel, Avatar 5, in 2028.

Cast 
 Sam Worthington as Jake Sully, a former human who fell in love with Neytiri and befriended the Na'vi after becoming a part of the Avatar Program, eventually taking their side in their conflict with humans. He transferred his mind into his avatar permanently. After the second film, he and his family left the Omatikaya clan and joined the Metkayina clan.
 Zoe Saldaña as Neytiri, Jake's wife who left the Omatikaya clan and joined the Metkayina clan.
 Sigourney Weaver as Kiri, the daughter of Dr. Grace Augustine's Na’vi avatar who was adopted by Jake and Neytiri.
 Stephen Lang as Colonel Miles Quaritch, a human who led the forces of the RDA, the human organization colonizing Pandora, in their conflict with the Na'vi in 2154. Years later, the RDA placed his and other deceased soldiers' memories into Na'vi Avatars called recombinants. 
 Cliff Curtis as Tonowari, the leader of the reef people clan of Metkayina.
 CCH Pounder as Mo'at, the Omaticaya's spiritual leader and Neytiri's mother.
 Jack Champion as Miles "Spider" Socorro, the teenaged son of Quaritch born in Hell's Gate who was rescued and adopted by Jake and Neytiri after they had previously killed his father, who "prefers his time in the Pandoran rainforest".
 Giovanni Ribisi as Parker Selfridge, the former corporate administrator for the RDA mining operation in the first film.
 David Thewlis as an unnamed Na'vi character who will be featured in Avatar 3 through 5
 Oona Chaplin as Varang, an "ash people" Na'vi

In addition to Champion, several other child actors who appeared in previous Avatar films are expected to reprise their roles.

Production

Development 
On July 31, 2017, it was announced that the New Zealand-based visual effects studio Weta Digital had commenced work on the Avatar sequels. Cameron stated that Avatar: The Tulkun Rider is being considered as a possible title for the film.  In January 2023, Cameron confirmed that, with Avatar: The Way of Water being profitable, Avatar 4 and 5 will get made.

Landau reported that the action of Avatar 4 will move from Pandora to Earth.  Landau said that "There's over-population and a depletion of our natural resources that make life harder. But we don't want to paint a bleak picture for where our world is going. The films are also about the idea of that we can change course."

Champion said that the "story is pretty amazing and pretty dark."

Casting 
In August 2017, Matt Gerald had officially signed on to portray his first film's role Corporal Lyle Wainfleet in all upcoming sequels. In August 2017, in an interview with Empire, Cameron said that Stephen Lang would not only be returning in all four sequels as Colonel Miles Quaritch, but that he would also be the main villain in all four films.

Filming 
Filming on all four sequels was supposed to begin simultaneously on September 25, 2017, in Manhattan Beach, California, but Cameron said that the filming on 4 and 5 would begin after post-production wrapped on the first two sequels. However, producer Jon Landau said in February 2019 that some motion capture scenes had been shot for Avatar 4, at the same time as its two predecessors. Landau later declared that a third of Avatar 4 has already been filmed for "logistical reasons". Elaborating on shooting a portion of 4 during the production of 2 and 3, Cameron stated that "I had to shoot the kids out. They're allowed to age six years in the middle of the story on page 25 of movie '4.' So I needed everything before then, and then everything after, we'll do later." On September 9, 2022, it was announced at the D23 Expo that principal photography had officially begun.

Music 
In August 2021, Landau announced that Simon Franglen would compose the score for the Avatar sequels.

Release 
Avatar 4 is scheduled to be released on December 18, 2026, by 20th Century Studios, two years after the release of Avatar 3 in December 2024.

Sequels 
A fifth film has been announced and is scheduled for December 22, 2028. Cameron stated in an interview with ABC News Australia that he is uncertain whether he will direct the fifth film. In 2022, Cameron revealed that he also has plans for a potential sixth and seventh film and would make them if there was demand.

References

External links 
 

20th Century Studios films
American action adventure films
American epic films
American science fiction action films
American science fiction war films
American sequel films
American space adventure films
Avatar (franchise) films
Dune Entertainment films
Environmental films
Fictional-language films
Films about cloning
Films about consciousness transfer
Films about extraterrestrial life
Films about paraplegics or quadriplegics
Films about rebellions
Films about technology
Films about telepresence
Films directed by James Cameron
Films produced by James Cameron
Films scored by Simon Franglen
Films set in the 22nd century
Films set on fictional moons
Films shot in Los Angeles County, California
Films shot in Hawaii
Films shot in New Zealand
Films with screenplays by James Cameron
Films using motion capture
Holography in films
IMAX films
Lightstorm Entertainment films
Planetary romances
Rotoscoped films
Social science fiction films
Transhumanism in film
Upcoming English-language films
Upcoming sequel films